Party Animals is a multiplayer physics-based brawler/party game developed by Recreate Games and published by Source Technology. The game is scheduled to be released for Microsoft Windows (via Steam), Xbox One and Xbox Series X/S. A demo version of the game was available as a free trial from June 16, 2020, to June 21, 2020, during the Steam Game Festival: Summer Edition and from October 4, 2020, to October 13, 2020, during the Steam Game Festival: Autumn Edition.

Gameplay 
Party Animals is a physics-based competitive brawler game where players play as various animals including puppies, kittens, ducks, bunnies, sharks, dinosaurs and even unicorns. Animals can punch, toss, jump, kick, and headbutt each other. They are also able to pick up an assortment of weapons. Upon taking a certain number of damage, players are temporarily knocked out. In most cases, they recover and return to the fight, unless they are tossed off the map or into various hazards.
Currently, the game encompasses two game modes, Last Stand, a free-for-all skirmish and Snatch Squad, an objective-based capture the flag style game mode. In Last Stand, the player battles up to 7 other animals with the objective of being the last animal standing. In Snatch Squad, players are divided into two teams of up to four players each and fight over gummies in the center of the arena that can be dropped into their team's pit for points. According to the game's official website, there are currently four maps and eleven playable characters

Development 
The game was developed by Recreate Games, a game studio founded by Luo Zixiong, the former design director at Smartisan. The game was first teased on Twitter in September 2019. Open demos of the game were available to the public in June and October 2020 for short periods of time. Developers revealed in a July 1, 2020 press release that the game will be released on consoles in the future.

On May 25, 2022, the developers released an update stating that "the game is still in development and the target release date is hopefully within 2022, with possible delays due to quality and compliance approvals."

Reception 
The game has received mostly positive reviews. During the Steam Game Festival: Autumn Edition, it reached a concurrent player peak of 135,834, making it the fourth most played game on Steam. The game amassed a large numbers of viewers on Twitch, having over 113,000 viewers watching gameplay streams.

References

External links 
 
 Recreate Games Website

Upcoming video games
Indie video games
Party video games
Video games developed in China
Windows games
Xbox One games
Xbox Series X and Series S games
3D beat 'em ups
Multiplayer video games